|}

The Beckford Stakes is a Listed flat horse race in Great Britain open to fillies and mares aged three years or older. It is run at Bath over a distance of 1 mile and 6 furlongs, and it is scheduled to take place each year in October.

The race was created as a new Listed race in 2016.

Winners

See also 
 Horse racing in Great Britain
 List of British flat horse races

References 

Racing Post:

Flat races in Great Britain
Bath Racecourse
Long-distance horse races for fillies and mares
Recurring sporting events established in 2016
2016 establishments in England